The following is the list of mosques in Nagorno-Karabakh.

List of mosques 

 Group

See also 
 List of mosques in Azerbaijan
 Islam in Azerbaijan
 Mosques in Azerbaijan
 Religion in Artsakh

 
Lists of religious buildings and structures in Azerbaijan
Artsakh
Nagorno-Karabakh-related lists